The 2016 Algarve Cup was the 23rd edition of the Algarve Cup, an invitational women's football tournament held annually in Portugal. It took place from 2 to 9 March.

Teams

Referees
On 19 February 2016, FIFA announced the referees and the assistant referees for the tournament.

Squads

Group stage
The groups were announced on 14 December 2015, with the match schedule being announced on 10 February 2016.
All times WET (UTC±00:00).

Tie-breaking criteria
For the group stage of this tournament, where two or more teams in a group tied on an equal number of points, the finishing positions will be determined by the following tie-breaking criteria in the following order:
 number of points obtained in the matches among the teams in question
 goal difference in all the group matches
 number of goals scored in all the group matches
 fair-play ranking in all the group matches
 FIFA ranking

Group A

Note: The Football Association of Iceland match report lists Elín Metta Jensen (10'), Denmark own goal (12'), Sandra Jessen (59') and Hólmfríður Magnúsdóttir (90') as the goal scorers of this match. However, for the statistics purpose of this page, the data provided by the tournament's organizer (Portuguese Football Federation) is being used.

Group B

Note: The New Zealand Football match report lists Annalie Longo (69') as the goal scorer of this match. However, for the statistics purpose of this page, the data provided by the tournament's organizer (Portuguese Football Federation) is being used.

Placement matches
Matches times and venues were announced on 7 March 2016.

7th Place

5th Place

3rd Place

Note: The official match report lists just the players who converted the penalties, in no particular order. New Zealand Football reports the missed penalty as being the sixth from New Zealand, citing Anna Green as the player who missed (contradicting the official report), without providing any information on the players who successfully converted their penalties. For the statistics purpose of this page, the data provided by the tournament's organizer (Portuguese Football Federation) is being used.

Final

Note: The Brazilian Football Confederation match report lists Cristiane as the Brazilian goal scorer of this match. However, for the statistics purpose of this page, the data provided by the tournament's organizer (Portuguese Football Federation) is being used.

Final standings

Goalscorers
4 goals

 Janice Cayman

2 goals

 Janine Beckie
 Nadia Nadim
 Sanne Troelsgaard
 Hólmfríður Magnúsdóttir
 Amber Hearn

1 goal

 Maud Coutereels
 Tine Schryvers
 Tessa Wullaert
 Andressa Alves
 Bia
 Cristiane
 Debinha
 Formiga
 Marta
 Raquel
 Thaís Guedes
 Summer Clarke
 Shelina Zadorsky
 Johanna Rasmussen
 Cecilie Sandvej
 Dagný Brynjarsdóttir
 Andrea Rán Snæfeld Hauksdóttir
 Gunnhildur Yrsa Jónsdóttir
 Katrín Ómarsdóttir
 Berglind Björg Þorvaldsdóttir
 Tatiana Pinto
 Diana Silva
 Daria Makarenko

Own goal
 Simone Boye Sørensen (playing against Belgium)

References

 
2016
2016 in women's association football
2015–16 in Portuguese football
March 2016 sports events in Europe
2016 in Portuguese women's sport